Irina-Camelia Begu was the defending champion, but lost in the second round to Jana Čepelová.

Lara Arruabarrena won the title, defeating Monica Niculescu in the final, 6–0, 2–6, 6–0.

Seeds

Draw

Finals

Top half

Bottom half

Qualifying

Seeds

Qualifiers

Draw

First qualifier

Second qualifier

Third qualifier

Fourth qualifier

External links
 Main draw
 Qualifying draw

2016 Singles
Korea Open Singles
Korea Open Singles